The current Grace Episcopal Church in Huron, South Dakota was built in 1963.  It is located at 16th and McClellan in Huron, South Dakota.

The previous stone church building at 4th and Kansas Street SE was added to the National Register of Historic Places on July 19, 1989. It was deemed significant "a good example of the English Gothic Revival style as commonly used by Episcopalians in the state. It is the oldest extant church building in Huron, South Dakota."

References

External links

 Grace Episcopal Church website
 Diocese of South Dakota website

Churches on the National Register of Historic Places in South Dakota
Gothic Revival church buildings in South Dakota
Churches completed in 1887
Buildings and structures in Huron, South Dakota
Episcopal churches in South Dakota
Churches in Beadle County, South Dakota
19th-century Episcopal church buildings
National Register of Historic Places in Beadle County, South Dakota
1887 establishments in Dakota Territory